Rookie Card is the debut studio album by New Zealand rapper PNC. It was released in New Zealand in 2006 and won best Hip Hop/Urban album in 2007 at the New Zealand Vodafone Music Awards.

The track "P-N-Woah" sampled The Staple Singers song, "This is Our Night", while "Just Roll" was made up almost entirely of quotes from 1990s songs.

Track listing

References

Sources
Digirama.co.nz

PNC (rapper) albums
2006 albums